Mercury Rev is an American rock band formed in 1989 in Buffalo, New York, with singer/guitarist Jonathan Donahue and guitarist/clarinetist/sound generator operator Sean "Grasshopper" Mackowiak as the only constant members. The band's music has incorporated indie rock, psychedelic rock, American roots music and noise rock, amongst other forms. Mercury Rev have been closely associated with The Flaming Lips, and the two bands have shared historical ties.

History

The first years with David Baker

Mercury Rev was formed in 1989 by students at the University at Buffalo, partially inspired by the drone music of composer/media studies professor Tony Conrad (then working as a teacher at the university, and a strong artistic influence on co-founder Grasshopper). The initial line-up was Donahue, Grasshopper, vocalist David Baker, bass guitarist/in-house producer Dave Fridmann, flute/French horn player Suzanne Thorpe and drummer Jimy Chambers. The band was initially formed to score its members' student films, and had a loose playing and recording existence. The band's initial music was a blend of experimental, psychedelic rock, drone and noise rock, which would gradually shift over time towards a melodic, ornate sound. 

At this early stage, several members also had other musical interests which prevented consistent Mercury Rev activity. Donahue worked as a gig promoter for other bands' concerts in Buffalo, which brought him into contact with The Flaming Lips in 1989: he then toured with them as guitar technician before formally joining as lead guitarist in time to play on their 1990 album In a Priest Driven Ambulance. The latter album was co-produced by Dave Fridman, who went on to co-produce every Flaming Lips studio album to date with the exception of 1993's Transmissions from the Satellite Heart.

Mercury Rev's debut album was 1991's Yerself is Steam, followed by the "Car Wash Hair" single, both of which typified the band's early merging of psychedelic rock and noise rock. During this year, the band had begun to solidify and concentrate on more sustained effort. Yerself is Steam had been completed during Donahue's breaks from Flaming Lips activity in tour and in Oklahoma: following creative disagreements with the band's frontman Wayne Coyne, Donahue left The Flaming Lips in mid-1991, shortly after recording the Hit to Death in the Future Head album. This enabled him to return to Buffalo and concentrate full-time on Mercury Rev. Meanwhile, although Dave Fridmann remained the band's bass player, co-producer and co-composer in the studio, he often had to step back from his role as live bass player due to increasing demands on his time as a record producer. Bassist John DeVries substituted for Fridmann at an increasing number of live shows, including an Ireland-and-England tour in the autumn of 1992, with Gerald Menke taking over live bass duties by 1993. 

Despite considerable critical acclaim, Mercury Rev's early releases gave them little more than cult popularity, although they did appear on the smaller second stage at some 1993 Lollapalooza stops. David Baker left Mercury Rev after their second record, Boces (1993), citing musical and personal disputes; he later recorded an album as Shady. With his departure, the thematically darker and musically experimental features of the band began to disappear.

Transitional period

The band's first post-Baker album, See You on the Other Side (1995) contained a variety of styles, including a sprawling psychedelic opening track and noise rock numbers like "Young Man's Stride" (for which a music video was released), but also more melodic songs, such as "Sudden Ray of Hope". By this time the live band included organist Adam Snyder and brothers Jason and Justin Russo of psychedelic rock band Hopewell (as bassist and keyboardist respectively.

That year, the group also recorded and released the album, Paralyzed Mind Of The Archangel Void, under the moniker "Harmony Rockets". The album featured a single forty minute track of mostly instrumental psychedelic improvised music. It was rated four and half stars, out of five, by AllMusic. (Fourteen years later, in 2009, the group would revisit it for performance in the Don't Look Back concert series.)

See You on the Other Side failed to sell well, a situation which helped to trigger a destructive period for the band during which they fell into debt, came into conflict with their record label, lost their manager and lawyers, and parted company with drummer Jimy Chambers (who would later resurface in the band Odiorne). Donahue and Grasshopper, in particular, were failing to communicate with each other and struggling with their individual drug and relationship problems.

While Grasshopper retreated to a Jesuit guest house in upstate New York, Donahue began to listen to records of children's music and to write simple melodies on piano (in contrast to the band's former psychedelic/electric compositional approach. At the same time, he was invited to guest on a Chemical Brothers track called "The Private Psychedelic Reel". This in turn inspired him to repair his musical and personal friendship with Grasshopper.

Wide critical and commercial success

Mercury Rev relocated to Donahue's birthplace of Kingston, New York, and began recording in the Catskill Mountains. The personnel for the album was a loose core of Donahue, Grasshopper and Thorpe joined by Fridmann and by former drummer Chambers, and augmented by local musicians including two former members of The Band - Garth Hudson and Levon Helm. The involvement of the latter began to shift the band's musical focus closer to roots and acoustic music. At the secondary recording and mixing stage, Donahue, Grasshopper and Fridmann opted not to use their previous method of distorted guitar and electronic overdubs and instead began to use strings, horns and woodwinds, resulting in more of a chamber pop sound while retaining a psychedelic tinge.  

The 1998 release of the resulting Deserter's Songs album met with acclaim, and made Mercury Rev unexpected pop stars. In the UK, NME magazine made Deserter's Songs their Album of the Year. Donahue's earnest, high-pitched vocals and concentration on relatively concise, melodic songs gave the band's material an entirely new feel and much increased popularity (Deserter's Songs spawned three UK Top 40 singles: "Delta Sun Bottleneck Stomp", "Opus 40" and "Goddess On A Hiway").
 
Suzanne Thorpe left Mercury Rev following the recording of the album, although she would return as a guest player for All is Dream. She would subsequently concentrate on academic research and emerge as a Deep Listening instructor, university lecturer and electro-acoustic improviser, as well as becoming part of "pirate-punk" band The Wounded Knees. (She has returned for occasional band revisitations of the Harmony Rockets project, including one at the 2009 All Tomorrow's Parties festival in England.)

The tours promoting Deserter's Songs saw the return of the Russo brothers and Adam Snyder (although all three would depart the live band during 2000). Jeff Mercel, who'd played on Deserter's Songs, also joined as touring drummer, and would soon become a full band member. 

By 2001, the band's nucleus was Grasshopper, Donahue and Mercel, with Fridmann remaining as co-producer and studio bass player. The All Is Dream album was issued in 2001 and became the band's highest charting album in the UK to date (#11). It included "Little Rhymes", "Nite and Fog" and "The Dark is Rising," which reached No. 16 in the UK Singles Chart. David Bowie producer Tony Visconti arranged strings and provided Mellotron parts for the album, which also featured contributions from Jason and Justin Russo. However, the Russo brothers did not join the band on tour this time, their places being taken by bass player Paul Dillon and by multi-instrumentalist Carlos Anthony Molina on keyboards, augmented by second keyboard player Michael Schirmer.

Later years

Molina had become a full Mercury Rev member by the time of Mercury Rev's fifth album, The Secret Migration, which was released on January 24, 2005, and on which he played both keyboards and bass guitar. The album featured the UK Top 40 single "In A Funny Way" (#28). The album itself reached #16 in the UK Albums chart. Mercel moved to keyboards for the subsequent tours, with his place on drums being taken on live dates by Jason Miranda. 

The Secret Migration was followed up in 2006, by a compilation album, The Essential Mercury Rev: Stillness Breathes 1991-2006 and the film soundtrack album Hello Blackbird. The band released a pair of albums on September 29, 2008: Snowflake Midnight, and a free MP3 album of instrumentals, Strange Attractor, following which Jeff Mercel left the band (although he would rejoin them on tour in 2011 to promote the release of the double disc reissue of Deserter's Songs). Former Midlake keyboardist Jesse Chandler was recruited to Mercury Rev in 2014.

The Light in You was released on October 2, 2015, through Bella Union, their first studio album in seven years. It reached #39 on the UK albums chart.  This was the first Mercury Rev album not to be co-produced by Dave Fridmann. By this point the band were officially a duo of Donahue and Grasshopper, with Molina, Miranda and Chandler still regularly contributing but as part of a set of support musicians.

Chandler was a full member by the time of Mercury Rev's next album, Bobbie Gentry's The Delta Sweete Revisited (as the title suggests, a reworking of Bobbie Gentry's seminal album The Delta Sweete), which was released in February 2019.  The album features instrumentation by Mercury Rev and a female guest singer unique to each song. Lucinda Williams, actress Carice van Houten, Beth Orton and Norah Jones were among the vocalists. The album was another UK Top 40 hit in the UK for the band (#32). 

"Holes" was covered by The National's lead singer Matt Berninger in 2020.

The 2021 Mercury Rev touring band featured Donahue, Grasshopper, bass player Chris Heitzman, drummer Don McCreevy and keyboard player Marion Genser.

Trivia

In 2021 "Holes" was featured in the popular Sing 2 movie. 
Other movies in which the band's songs can be heard are Gunpowder Milkshake (2020, "Goddess On A Hiway") and Love And Monsters (2020, "Opus 40").

Band members
 Jonathan Donahue – vocals and guitar
 Sean "Grasshopper" Mackowiak – guitar, keyboards, clarinet, tettix wave accumulator
 Ted Young – live sound
 Marion Genser - Mellotron, Vox Organ
 Chris Heitzman – bass
 Don McGreevy - drums

Discography

Albums

Compilation albums, live albums and soundtracks
 2002 - Instant Karma - A Tribute to John Lennon (song, "Isolation")
 2004 - " Late Great Daniel Johnston: Discovered Covered"
 2006 - The Essential Mercury Rev: Stillness Breathes 1991-2006
 2006 - Hello Blackbird (soundtrack to the film Bye Bye Blackbird)
 2006 - Back to Mine (compiled by Mercury Rev, includes exclusive new track "Cecilla's Lunar Expose")
 2009 - The Peel Sessions
 2011 - Beyond The Swirling Clouds - An Evening At Barrowland Ballroom Recorded live on March 6, 2005, at Barrowland Ballroom, Glasgow.
 2012 - Live In Brixton '92

Singles and EPs
 1992 - "Lego My Ego'" (re-released with 1999 re-issue of "Yerself Is Steam")
 1992 - "Car Wash Hair"
 1992 - "If You Want Me to Stay"
 1993 - "The Hum Is Coming From Her"
 1993 - "Chasing a Bee"
 1993 - "Bronx Cheer"
 1993 - "Something for Joey"
 1995 - "Everlasting Arm"
 1995 - "Young Man's Stride"
 1998 - "Goddess on a Hiway" - UK No. 51
 1998 - "Delta Sun Bottleneck Stomp" - No. 26
 1999 - "Opus 40" - No. 31
 1999 - "Holes" (Australia only)
 1999 - "Goddess on a Hiway" - No. 26 (1999 re-issue)
 2001 - "Nite and Fog" - No. 47
 2002 - "The Dark Is Rising" - No. 16
 2002 - "Little Rhymes" - No. 51
 2004 - "Secret for a Song" (internet download only)
 2005 - "In a Funny Way" - No. 28
 2005 - "Across Yer Ocean" - No. 54
 2008 - "Senses on Fire"
 2009 - "Butterfly's Wing"

Other contributions
Acoustic 05 (2005, Echo) - "First Time Mothers Joy"
Ciao My Shining Star: The Songs of Mark Mulcahy (2009, Mezzotint) - "Sailors and Animals" (Miracle Legion cover)

See also
List of dream pop artists

References

External links

 
 
 Mercury Rev at WorldMusicDatabase
 V2Music: Mercury Rev
 Review of 'Butterfly's Wings'
 Silvertone Series No. 2 Mercury Rev in Russia. An interview for Podstantsiya.ru

 
Alternative rock groups from New York (state)
Chamber pop musicians
Indie rock musical groups from New York (state)
Musical groups established in 1989
Neo-psychedelia groups
Musical groups from Buffalo, New York
Psychedelic pop music groups
Avant-pop musicians
Rock music groups from New York (state)
Beggars Banquet Records artists
Columbia Records artists
Rough Trade Records artists
V2 Records artists
Sibling musical groups
1989 establishments in New York (state)
Yep Roc Records artists
Bella Union artists
Partisan Records artists